

Executive Records
 Bank Melli Iran: Member of the Board of Directors
 Bank Melli Iran: Chairman of the High Risk Committee
 Bank Melli Iran: Chairman of the Marketing Committee
 Bank Melli Iran: Chairman of the Department of Innovation
 National Development Holding Company: Chairman of the Board
 Esteghlal F.C.: Member of the Board of Directors

Directors
 Qazvin – Zanjan – Tabriz Freeway Company: Chairman of the Board
 Commission of the Islamic Republic of Iran Banks: Secretary

Organization and Methods Department
 Pars Agricultural & Industrial Company: Member of the Board

Directors
 Bank Melli Iran of Gilan Province: General Director
 Bank Melli Iran of Ardabil Province: General Director

Articles and books
 Aiming for Excellency, With Which Wing?
 Crisis Management, Decision-making in Critical Situations
 Miracle Workers of Management
 Paradox of Private Banks
 National Currency
 Marketing & Customer Caring
 Making for Survival
 Welfare & Contentment of Society: What is the Solution?
 World Based on Wisdom
 Pygmalion in Management

References

External links
 دیدگاه نو

1964 births
Living people
Iranian chief executives
Iranian bankers
Iranian economists
People from Ardabil